ChemistryOpen is a monhtly peer-reviewed, open access, scientific journal covering all areas of chemistry and related fields. It is published by Wiley-VCH on behalf of Chemistry Europe.

According to the Journal Citation Reports, the journal has a 2021 impact factor of 2.630, ranking it 109th out of 179 journals in the category "Chemistry, Multidisciplinary".

References

External links

Chemistry Europe academic journals
Wiley-VCH academic journals
English-language journals
Chemistry journals
Open access journals
Monthly journals